Argir is a village in the Faroe Islands.

Argir most likely takes its name from Old Irish airge meaning summer pasture.; several placenames in Faroe carry the same name with this meaning. Once a village south of Tórshavn, Argir has grown and is now merged with Tórshavn. In 1997 it joined the municipality of Tórshavn.

In recent years more houses have been built in Argir and the village, or quarter, has grown upwards into the hills. This area has views over the sea and the capital.

There is a boat harbour with boathouses in Argir and a church which was built in 1974.

From the 16th century until 1750 there was a leprosy-hospital in Argir. Some paupers lived there too. When the hospital closed the building was turned into a workhouse for the poor.

Argir's football team is called AB (Argja Bóltfelag). Argir has a rowing club called Argja Róðrarfelag; its boats are red and have a dragon head on the prow.

Gallery

See also 
 List of towns in the Faroe Islands

References and notes

External links 
 Faroeislands.dk: Agir Images and description of all cities on the Faroe Islands.

Populated places in the Faroe Islands
Populated coastal places in the Faroe Islands